The Infanticide Act 1938 (1 & 2 Geo 6 c 36) is an Act of the Parliament of the United Kingdom. It creates the offence of infanticide for England and Wales.

Section 1 - Offence of infanticide
Sections 1(1) to (3) now read:

Amendments

The word "if" was substituted for the words "notwithstanding that" in sections 1(1) and (2) by sections 57(2)(a) and (3)(a) of the Coroners and Justice Act 2009. The words "or manslaughter" were inserted in sections 1(1) and (2) by sections 57(2)(a) and (3)(a) of that Act.

The words at the end of section 1(3) were repealed by Part III of Schedule 3 to the Criminal Law Act 1967. Section 1(4) was also repealed by that Part.

"Notwithstanding that"

In R v Gore, the Court of Appeal held that this expression meant "even if".

Restriction on institution of proceedings

Proceedings against a woman for infanticide, if the injury alleged to have caused the death was sustained more than three years before the death occurred, or the person has previously been convicted of an offence committed in circumstances alleged to be connected with the death, may only be instituted by or with the consent of the Attorney General.

Alternative verdict

Where on the trial of any person for infanticide the jury are of the opinion that the person charged is not guilty of infanticide, but that she is shown by the evidence to be guilty of child destruction, the jury may find her guilty of that offence.

Mode of trial

Infanticide is triable only on indictment.

Sentence

The effect of the words "punished as if she had been guilty of the offence of manslaughter" is that a person convicted of infanticide is liable to imprisonment for life.

Section 2 - Short title, extent and repeal
Section 2(2) provides that the Act does not extend to Scotland or Northern Ireland.

Section 2(3) repealed the Infanticide Act 1922. It was in turn repealed by the Statute Law Revision Act 1950 because it was spent by virtue of the Interpretation Act 1889.

See also
Infanticide Act

References
Halsbury's Statutes,

External links

The Infanticide Act 1938, as amended from the National Archives.
The Infanticide Act 1938, as originally enacted from the National Archives.

United Kingdom Acts of Parliament 1938
Infanticide